Snack and Half (aka: Snack and a Half) is a frozen ice cream treat made by Scotsburn. It is composed of vanilla ice cream squished between two oatmeal cookies and covered in chocolate.

Availability
Snack and Half is sold individually in Canadian stores. In late 2017, ScotsBurn redesigned the packaging and renamed the ice cream treat as "Super Snack".

See also
 List of frozen dessert brands

References

Brand name frozen desserts

2. https://scotsburn.com/page/branded_products/category/single_serve_novelties/product_line/sandwiches/product/0_63124_03014_8/